Owingen is a municipality in the district "Bodenseekreis" in Baden-Württemberg in Germany.

Geography

Geographical Location 
Owingen is located about six kilometers north of Überlingen in the "Lake Costance"-Region.

Municipal division 
The municipality consist of the core town of Owingen, and the districts Billafingen, Hohenbodman and Taisersdorf.

Protected Areas 
Look: List of Nature Monuments in Owingen

In Owingen are the Naturschutzgebiet Aachtobel and the Landschaftsschutzgebiet Drumlin "Im Hasenbühl" and "Gegez", two part areas by the FFH-Gebiets Bodensee Hinterland at Überlingen, and four water conservation areas.

History 
Owingen's first documentary mention can be found in the "Peterhaus Chronic" of 1134. However, the area was already in the 5th century populated by the Alemans. The district of Taisersdorf was first documented in 1155.

Through the following centuries, a close albeit not always frictionless connection with the Salem Monastery, to which the village had been subordinate since 1324.

In the Thirty Years' War, Owingen was destroyed by the swedes in 1634 and looted by the French in 1643.

Owingen became Baden with the Principal Conclusion of the Extraordinary Imperial Delegation and the secularization of the Salem Imperial Abbey. During the revolution, Owingen made weapons and soldiers available to the Baden Civil Armed Forces in May 1849.

The municipality coped well with structural change after the Second World War and has roughly increased its population to this day. In the 1960s, Owingen was one of the first municipalities outside the larger cities on Lake Constance to have its own sewerage treatment plant.

Owingen was an independent municipality in the district of Überlingen from 1939, which in the course of the district reform on the 1st January 1973 merged into the new Lake Constance District.

The municipality became internationally when two planes collided on the 1st July 2002. In the airspace above Owingen, a Bashkirian Airlines passenger aircraft (Flight 2937) collided with a DHL cargo aircraft (Flight 611). 71 people died in the accident, including many children who were travelled to Spain.

Politics

Administrative community 
Owingen has entered into an agreed administrative community with the municipality of Sipplingen and the large district town of Überlingen.

Mayors 

 1831–1842: Fidel Endres
 1842–1869: Johann Storck
 1870–1874: Josef Keller
 1874–1896: Josef Endres
 1896–1904: Gerhard Gams
 1904–1929: Wilhelm Endres
 1929–1945: Karl Mayer
 1946: Edwin Lutz
 1946–1969: Josef Fischer
 1969–2001: Karl-Friedrich Reiner
 2001–2009: Günther Former
 October 2009–January 2010 Rudolf Fischer
 Since 2010: Henrik Wengert

References

 Statistisches Landesamt Baden-Württemberg – Bevölkerung nach Nationalität und Geschlecht am 31. Dezember 2020 (CSV-Datei) (Hilfe dazu).
 ↑ Hochspringen nach:a b c d e f g h Eva-Maria Bast: Owingen. „Ich fühle mich hier pudelwohl“. In: Die Region stellt sich vor. Wir sind hier. Sonderbeilage des Südkurier vom 19. November 2010, S. 8.
 ↑ Owingen: 1611 ha 21 a 95 m2
 ↑ Billafingen: 917 ha 3 a 43 m2
 ↑ Hohenbodman: 811 ha 14 a 45 m2
 ↑ Taisersdorf 333 ha 44 a 80 m2
 ↑ Daten- und Kartendienst der LUBW
 ↑ Hochspringen nach:a b Statistisches Bundesamt (Hrsg.): . W. Kohlhammer, Stuttgart/Mainz 1983, S. 503.
 ↑ Statistisches Bundesamt (Hrsg.): . W. Kohlhammer, Stuttgart/Mainz 1983, S. 546.
 ↑ Statistisches Landesamt BW-Endgültige Ergebnisse der Gemeinderatswahlen 2014 (Seite nicht mehr abrufbar, Suche in Webarchiven)  Info: Der Link wurde automatisch als defekt markiert. Bitte prüfe den Link gemäß Anleitung und entferne dann diesen Hinweis.
 ↑ : Hans-Peter Walter (hpw): Knotenpunkt für Postkutschen. In: Südkurier vom 9. September 2010.
 ↑ Hochspringen nach:a b Angelika Thiel: Taisersdorf anno dazumal. In: Südkurier vom 3. Juli 2010.
 ↑ Franz Bohnstedt: Der Schloßbühl von Owingen. In: Schriften des Vereins für Geschichte des Bodensees und seiner Umgebung, 79. Jg. 1961, S. 120–125 (Digitalisat)
 ↑ Südkurier-Grafik: Orlowski/ Quelle: Hauptzollamt Ulm: Zahl der Kleinbrenner. In: Hanspeter Walter (hpw): Das alte Monopol läuft aus. In: Südkurier vom 17. Dezember 2011

Bodenseekreis